Heddington is a village and civil parish in Wiltshire, England  south of Calne. The parish includes the hamlet of Heddington Wick.

King's Play Hill is a biological Site of Special Scientific Interest within the parish.

History 
On King's Play Hill, east of Heddington village, are a Neolithic long barrow and two bowl barrows.

The northern boundary of the parish follows the Roman road from London to Bath. In the early medieval period, the same course was followed by the Wansdyke earthwork.

In the 17th and 18th centuries the London-Bath road followed part of the southern boundary of the parish, where it climbed Beacon Hill.  This route declined from the mid-18th century in favour of the road through Calne.

A small estate called Splatts originated with land purchases in the 1620s by Robert Child, whose son Francis was the founder of one of the first London banks, Child & Co. The land descended in the Child family and in 1729 Splatts House was built for another Francis Child on his marriage to Priscilla Brooke. The estate continued as the seat of the Childs until 1780 when it was superseded by Osterley Park, London.

A small school, with attached house, was built in the village c. 1833, became a National School in 1860, and was attended by 45–50 children in the 1870s.

Religious sites
There was a church at Heddington c. 1130, when it was given to Monkton Farleigh Priory. The Church of England parish church of St Andrew dates from a 13th-century rebuilding and the south arcade survives from that period; the north arcade is from the 14th. The tower is 15th-century and the building was restored in 1840-1 and 1976. The font may be from the 12th century or may be an 1840s copy. The tower has six bells, of which one is dated 1605 and three 1741. The building was designated as Grade II* listed in 1960.

Parish registers date back to 1538. In 1887, Stockley was transferred from Calne ecclesiastical parish to Heddington. The benefice was united with Calstone Wellington (which until then had been united with Blackland) in 1962. Since 1973 the parish has been part of the Oldbury benefice.

Quakers were active in the parish from the late 17th century and by 1681 had a burial ground west of the church, which went out of use before 1818 and was sold c. 1930.

Wesleyan Methodists built a small brick chapel in 1851 near Heddington Wick, on the road to Heddington; by 1864 its Sunday school was well attended. The chapel fell into disuse in the mid 20th century and was used as a scout hall from 1962; by 2012 it was derelict.

A Theravada Buddhist meditation centre – The International Meditation Centre in the tradition of Sayagyi U Ba Khin and Mother Sayamagyi – has been situated in Splatts House since late 1978.

Amenities 
The school continues as Heddington CofE (VA) Primary School. A village hall stands next to the school, and the village has a public house, the Ivy. The Wessex Ridgeway long-distance footpath crosses the southeast of the parish.

Every July, the parish is host to the Heddington and Stockley Steam Rally which attracts steam engine owners from across the globe.

References

External links
 Heddington at Wiltshire Community History
 Parish Information Oldbury Benefice Community Gateway
 Buddhist Centre Information International Meditation Centre

Villages in Wiltshire
Civil parishes in Wiltshire